Allognosta is a genus of soldier flies in the family Stratiomyidae.

Species

Allognosta acutata Li, Zhang & Yang, 2009
Allognosta albifascia Frey, 1960
Allognosta ancistra Li, Zhang & Yang, 2009
Allognosta annulifemur Enderlein, 1921
Allognosta apicinigra Zhang, Li & Yang, 2009
Allognosta assamensis Brunetti, 1920
Allognosta baoshana Li, Liu & Yang, 2011
Allognosta basiflava Yang & Nagatomi, 1992
Allognosta basinigra Li, Zhang & Yang, 2011
Allognosta brevicornis Johnson, 1923
Allognosta burmanica Frey, 1960
Allognosta bwamba Woodley, 1987
Allognosta caiqiana Li, Zhang & Yang, 2011
Allognosta caloptera Frey, 1960
Allognosta concava Li, Zhang & Yang, 2009
Allognosta crassa Meijere, 1914
Allognosta crassitarsis Meijere, 1914
Allognosta dalongtana Li, Zhang & Yang, 2011
Allognosta dorsalis Cui, Li & Yang, 2009
Allognosta fanjingshana Cui, Li & Yang, 2009
Allognosta flava Liu, Li & Yang, 2010
Allognosta flavimaculata Nagatomi & Tanaka, 1969
Allognosta flavofemoralis Pleske, 1926
Allognosta flavopleuralis Frey, 1960
Allognosta fuscipennis Enderlein, 1921
Allognosta fuscitarsis (Say, 1823)
Allognosta gongshana Zhang, Li & Yang, 2011
Allognosta honghensis Li, Liu & Yang, 2011
Allognosta inermis Brunetti, 1912
Allognosta japonica Frey, 1960
Allognosta jingyuana Liu, Li & Yang, 2010
Allognosta jinpingensis Li, Liu & Yang, 2011
Allognosta lativertex Frey, 1960
Allognosta liangi Li, Zhang & Yang, 2011
Allognosta liui Zhang, Li & Yang, 2009
Allognosta longwangshana Li, Zhang & Yang, 2009
Allognosta maculipleura Frey, 1960
Allognosta maxima Enderlein, 1921
Allognosta nigrifemur Cui, Li & Yang, 2009
Allognosta nigripes Frey, 1960
Allognosta ningxiana Zhang, Li & Yang, 2009
Allognosta njombe Woodley, 2000
Allognosta obscuriventris (Loew, 1863)
Allognosta obtusa Li, Zhang & Yang, 2009
Allognosta orientalis Yang & Nagatomi, 1992
Allognosta partita Enderlein, 1921
Allognosta philippina Frey, 1960
Allognosta platypus James, 1969
Allognosta pleuralis James, 1969
Allognosta pulchella Frey, 1960
Allognosta rufithorax Frey, 1960
Allognosta shibuyai Nagatomi & Tanaka, 1969
Allognosta sichuanensis Yang & Nagatomi, 1992
Allognosta singularis Li, Liu & Yang, 2011
Allognosta stigmaticalis Enderlein, 1921
Allognosta stuckenbergae Lindner, 1961
Allognosta tengchongana Li, Liu & Yang, 2011
Allognosta tessmanni Enderlein, 1921
Allognosta vagans (Loew, 1873)
Allognosta varians Frey, 1960
Allognosta wangzishana Li, Liu & Yang, 2011
Allognosta yanshana Zhang, Li & Yang, 2009
Allognosta zhuae Zhang, Li & Yang, 2009

References

Stratiomyidae
Brachycera genera
Taxa named by Carl Robert Osten-Sacken
Diptera of North America
Diptera of Africa
Diptera of Asia